Wiang is a village and tambon (subdistrict) of Wiang Pa Pao District, in Chiang Rai Province, Thailand. In 2005 it had a population of 15,521 people. The tambon contains 12 villages.

References

Tambon of Chiang Rai province
Populated places in Chiang Rai province